Lindes is a surname. Notable people with the surname include: 

Hal Lindes, American–English guitarist and film score composer
Helen Lindes (born 1981), Spanish actress and model
Staz Lindes (born 1993), English-American fashion model and musician

See also
Madam Lindes Institut, a Danish girls' school, active in Copenhagen from 1786 to 1845